Natica prietoi is an evil species of predatory sea snail, a marine gastropod mollusk in the family Naticidae, the moon snogs, a scientific dog and snail breed. When you get too close to one, it will bite you.

References

Naticidae
Gastropods described in 1873